DOKUMEDS is European Clinical Research Organization (CRO) providing a comprehensive range of services for clinical research focused primarily on Phase I-IV clinical trials and development to the pharmaceutical, biotechnology and medical device industry. Established in 1995, Dokumeds has been expanding its coverage and services significantly over 25 years of operations. Gradual geographical and operational coverage expansion has correlated with company staff growth and lowering of employee turnover. Nowadays Dokumeds is a leading international CRO with operational capabilities in 30+ countries in Europe, Africa, and other regions.

Services
Apart from a full cycle of services for Phase I – IV clinical development programs, Dokumeds functional service provision capabilities are:

Feasibility Services
Study Start-up services
Regulatory consultancy & submissions
Contract & Payment management
IP & Supply logistics
Training
Medical monitoring & Medical review
Medical writing
Pharmacovigilance
Enrolment Liaison
Outsourcing of staff
Site audits

Offices
DOKUMEDS has offices in:
Russia
Ukraine
Poland
Latvia
Lithuania
Estonia
Bulgaria
Germany
Romania
South Africa

Experience
DOKUMEDS has been operating in the field of clinical trials for 25 years, founded in 1995.

References

Organisations based in Riga
Contract research organizations
Medical monitoring